Boleskine may refer to:
Boleskine House, a manor house in Scotland owned by Aleister Crowley and Jimmy Page
Lord Boleskine, a pseudonym of Aleister Crowley
Boleskine Camanachd, a shinty team